Spruce Creek may refer to:

Canada
 Spruce Creek (British Columbia), a stream in the Atlin Country

United States
Colorado
 Spruce Creek (Larimer County, Colorado), a tributary of the Big Thompson River

Florida
 Spruce Creek Airport, in Port Orange
 Spruce Creek High School, in Port Orange
 Spruce Creek (Florida), a tributary of the Halifax River

Iowa
 Spruce Creek (Iowa) a tributary of the Upper Mississippi River

Maine
 Spruce Creek (Maine), a creek in York County, Maine

New York
 Spruce Creek (New York), crossed by the Salisbury Center Bridge in Herkimer County

Pennsylvania
 Spruce Creek (Pennsylvania), a tributary of the Little Juniata River
 Spruce Creek, Pennsylvania, an unincorporated community
 Spruce Creek Township, Huntingdon County, Pennsylvania

West Virginia
 Spruce Creek (West Virginia), a stream in Ritchie County